Gods and Kings: The Rise and Fall of Alexander McQueen and John Galliano is a 2015 book by Paris-based American journalist Dana Thomas.

Synopsis
Gods and Kings: The Rise and Fall of Alexander McQueen and John Galliano is a double biography on the lives two heralded British fashion designers, Alexander McQueen and John Galliano.

Reception 
Critical reception for Gods and Kings has been positive. The New York Times wrote that "Ms. Thomas has produced a slightly seedy-feeling but, yes, addictive biography of two outsize personalities who seem less the gods or kings of her title than Captain Hook and Peter Pan." In contrast, The Guardian heavily criticized the book for offering an uneven portrayal of McQueen and Galliano, stating that "to read her brass-tacks account, you’d get the impression that Galliano’s career has been fail after fail. She implicates the “gushing” fashion press in praising his work – we’re an easy bunch to disparage – yet she seems more or less blind to the meaning and emotion others may have felt at Galliano’s or McQueen’s shows."

References

External links
 "Five Lessons about Self-Destruction All Creative People Should Know". Refinery29.

Biographies (books)
2015 non-fiction books
Penguin Press books
Alexander McQueen